Area code 440 is a telephone area code in the North American Numbering Plan (NANP) for the U.S. state of Ohio, serving the parts of the Greater Cleveland area, surrounding the city of Cleveland, but not the city and most of its inner suburbs.

History
Area code 440 was established on August 16, 1997, in a three-way split of area code 216, one of the original North American area codes. to provide relief from central office prefix exhaustion from increasing popularity of cellular phones and population pressure. The 216 numbering plan area (NPA) had already been divided the preceding year in 1996 to create area code 330 to the south, with NPA 216 stretching along the coast of Lake Erie.

Prior to October 2021, area code 440 had telephone numbers assigned for the central office code 988. In 2020, 988 was designated nationwide as a dialing code for the National Suicide Prevention Lifeline, which created a conflict for exchanges that permit seven-digit dialing. This area code was therefore scheduled to transition to ten-digit dialing by October 24, 2021.

In December 2022, the Public Utilities Commission of Ohio announced a projection that the pool of available telephone numbers for the 440 area code would be exhausted by the third quarter of 2024. The Commission approved a plan of relief action which prescribes an all-service overlay in the numbering plan area with the new area code 436.
The projected activation date is March 2024.

Service area
Area code 440 serves most of the southern, western, and eastern suburbs of Cleveland, including the larger cities and communities of Ashtabula, Eastlake, Elyria, Lorain, Mentor, North Olmsted, North Ridgeville, North Royalton, Parma, Solon, Strongsville, Westlake and Willoughby. 440 serves all of Lake and Geauga counties. It also serves almost all of Ashtabula and Lorain counties, part of Erie County, the northeast corner of Huron County, and the northwest part of Trumbull County.  It also covers far eastern Cuyahoga County, the rest of which stayed in 216. The largest city in the numbering plan area is Parma, Ohio. 

The numbering plan area is just barely contiguous, joined by a narrow section in the south.

See also
 List of Ohio area codes
 List of NANP area codes

References

External links

 List of exchanges from AreaCodeDownload.com, 440 Area Code

Telecommunications-related introductions in 1997
440
440
Ashtabula County, Ohio
Cuyahoga County, Ohio
Erie County, Ohio
Geauga County, Ohio
Huron County, Ohio
Lake County, Ohio
Lorain County, Ohio
Trumbull County, Ohio